Thermoanaerobacter thermocopriae, previously known as Clostridium thermocopriae is a bacterium belonging to the Bacillota.

References

Thermoanaerobacterales
Thermophiles
Anaerobes
Bacteria described in 1994